Diego della Quadra (died 1604) was a Roman Catholic prelate who served as Bishop of Lavello (1602–1604).

Biography
On 26 June 1602, Diego della Quadra was appointed by Pope Clement VIII as Bishop of Lavello.
He served as Bishop of Lavello until his death in 1604.

References

External links and additional sources
 (Chronology of Bishops) 
 (Chronology of Bishops) 

16th-century Italian Roman Catholic bishops
1604 deaths
Bishops appointed by Pope Clement VIII